The Doctors is an American daytime soap opera television series which aired on NBC from April 1, 1963, to December 31, 1982.

From anthology to serial

For most of the series, storylines revolved around Hope Memorial Hospital and its patriarch Chief of staff Dr. Matt Powers (played by James Pritchett), who started on the program on July 9, 1963, although Pritchett originally appeared on the series during its weekly anthology period, in another role.

The cast for the original daily concept, which lasted from the premiere on April 1, 1963, until July 19, 1963, was:

Jock Gaynor as Dr. William Scott (April 1, 1963 – July 19, 1963, premiere cast)
Richard Roat as Dr. Jerry Chandler (April 1, 1963 – January 17, 1964, premiere cast)
Margot Moser as Dr. Elizabeth Hayes (April 1, 1963 – July 19, 1963, premiere cast)
Fred J. Scollay as Rev. Sam Shafer (April 1, 1963 – 1966, premiere cast)

The early cast for the second, weekly concept, which lasted from July 22, 1963, until February 28, 1964, was:

Richard Roat as Dr. Jerry Chandler (April 1, 1963 – January 17, 1964, premiere cast)
Fred J. Scollay as Rev. Sam Shafer (April 1, 1963 – 1966, premiere cast)
James Pritchett as Dr. Matt Powers (July 22, 1963 – December 31, 1982)
Rex Thompson as Michael Powers  (July 22, 1963 – 1966)
Ann Williams as Dr. Maggie Fielding (July 22, 1963 – May 25, 1965)
Joseph Campanella as Alec Fielding  (August 19–23, 1963)
Ruth McDevitt as Mrs. McMurtrie (Rev. Shafer's housekeeper) (September 16, 1963 - July 9, 1964)
Charles Braswell as Alec Fielding  (January 20 – February 11, 1964)
Scott Graham as Dr. Johnny McGill (January 20, 1964 – December 1964)
Joan Anderson as Nora Hansen Lloyd (March 9, 1964 – 1966)

Storylines
In the program's early years, The Doctors was considered to be more bold in storyline choices than its primary rival at the time, General Hospital (which premiered on the same day, with a similar premise to TD). While the doctors on General Hospital worked in harmony with one another for the most part and in some cases were intimate friends, the physicians on The Doctors were shown in stories that balanced personal and professional concerns. Some doctors were depicted as competitive and cutthroat. The Doctors incorporated humor and realism into its storylines, and remained anchored to actual medical work in its setting.

For example, when Matt Powers was on trial for murder, he was forced to rescind his Chief of Staff position. His successor schemed to remove his allies, such as Dr. Althea Davis, from positions of influence in the hospital. Althea's stories included her challenges as a female doctor working with a mainly male staff; one story outlined how Althea's divorce was discussed by the board as a moral issue in a way that no male doctor's personal life had ever been discussed.

Other notable storylines explored cancer and drug addiction. Doreen Aldrich (played by Jennifer Wood and then by Pamela Lincoln) suffered from leukemia, and Joan Dancy (Margaret Whitton) struggled with an addiction to drugs. 

In its final years, the show began to move away from its early realism and sobriety in plot toward more stereotypically "soapish" writing. For example, one storyline centered around a woman over 60 years old who impersonated her daughter Adrienne Hunt (Nancy Stafford) by taking a special serum that would keep the old woman younger, but caused the death of Billy Aldrich (Alec Baldwin) in the process.

Awards and production
In 1972 and 1974, the serial received a Daytime Emmy Award for Best Drama. During that period until a new opening sequence was created in 1977, announcer Mel Brandt (who was also known for his announcing the animated "Laramie Peacock" color opening in the 1960s and 1970s) would inform the audience at the beginning of each episode: "And now, The Doctors, (The Emmy-Award winning program) dedicated to the brotherhood of healing." The iconic theme song "Patterns", which was updated with a new version in 1977 and 1979, stayed with the program through August 1, 1980 and was composed by in-house musician Bob Israel at Score Productions. It debuted with the episode which aired on May 24, 1971.

Episodes of The Doctors were originally taped in black and white at Studio 3B, one of NBC's production studios at 30 Rockefeller Center in New York City. It was the last NBC daytime serial to transition from black and white to color on October 17, 1966.

For most of its run, The Doctors was packaged and sponsored by the Colgate-Palmolive company through its Channelex division; in September 1980, NBC moved production in-house when C-P decided to close Channelex. However, C-P continued to buy much of the program's advertising time until its cancellation.

Broadcast history

Original series run
The popularity of The Doctors took off in the late 1960s, when it was featured in advertisements for NBC's 90-minute serial block. NBC first placed the program at 2:30 p.m. Eastern/1:30 Central, where it would eventually air in between Days of Our Lives (starting in November 1965) and Another World (starting in May 1964). When The Doctors premiered in 1963, it replaced entertainment mogul Merv Griffin's first daytime talk show in the 2:30 timeslot, and remained in the slot for nearly sixteen years.

From the late 1960s until the mid-1970s, The Doctors ranked as one of the top five daytime dramas in the United States. It peaked at fourth place in the 1973–1974 television season, behind CBS' As the World Turns and fellow NBC serials Days of our Lives and Another World. However, within a period of three years, The Doctors plummeted from fourth to eleventh in the ratings. The decline in ratings was partly attributed to two serials with which The Doctors shared its timeslot: ABC's One Life to Live and CBS's Guiding Light, which expanded to an hour in consecutive years; ABC increased the running time of One Life to Live from 45 minutes in 1976 to an hour in 1978 while CBS expanded Guiding Light to an hour in length in 1977.

As the 1979 season began, the entire NBC soap opera lineup was suffering in the ratings. While The Doctors was not alone in this, the network began a series of relocations involving the veteran serial that year, which would amplify the series' ratings trouble and eventually lead to its demise. The first move was done to help boost the ratings of Another World, which had fallen off significantly after reaching the top spot the previous season tied with As The World Turns  also falling in the rating as well.  In an unprecedented (and since unrepeated) move, NBC decided to extend Another World and make it the first serial to run for ninety minutes daily. The Doctors and Days of Our Lives were both moved ahead thirty minutes to accommodate the switch, but managed to finish just 0.2 points lower in the Nielsen ratings.

Then, in 1980, the producers of Another World began development on a new serial. The project eventually became the Another World spinoff Texas, which NBC had wanted to serve as a daytime version of the then-popular CBS primetime serial Dallas. On August 4, 1980, after reducing Another World and The David Letterman Show by thirty minutes each, NBC launched Texas at 3:00/2:00 PM. Another World was the lead-in for the spin-off  moving  back a half hour to 2:00/1:00PM in 1980.  The Doctors was shifted to the only open spot on the network's lineup, the 12:30 p.m./11:30 a.m. slot following Card Sharks. The move, however, did not come without problems. The noon hour would often see affiliates of the three major networks opt not to air their offerings for at least part of, if not all of, the timeslot and usually air a local newscast or some other programming, and The Doctors disappeared from some markets when it made the move. In addition, the 12:30 timeslot was a competitive one for the three networks. ABC's competition came from Ryan's Hope, which had been beating The Doctors by nearly a full ratings point in the overall rankings. The serial's competition on CBS originally consisted of the long-running Search for Tomorrow, which was also pulling in significantly higher ratings than The Doctors had been. In June 1981, CBS moved The Young and the Restless to 12:30 and the ratings faded even further. The Doctors fell to a 3.8 rating at the end of the 1980–81 season and again to a 3.3 the following year.

NBC had not completed its reshuffling of the daytime lineup, though, and on March 29, 1982, The Doctors was moved ahead another half hour to noon/11:00 Central, resulting in the cancellation of Password Plus. The move was made after the network acquired its former rival  Search for Tomorrow placing it in the 12:30/11:30 slot where The Doctors was after CBS moved the show from that same time slot it held for thirty years to boost the rating for The Young and the Restless;. It became available to NBC after CBS opted not to renew the serial instead of returning it to the 12:30 spot it lost to The Young and the Restless. In April of that year, NBC moved Texas to 11:00 a.m./10:00 Central to give The Doctors a lead-in and to try to increase the soap's low ratings.

Despite NBC's acquisition of Search for Tomorrow, the move of Texas to the 11:00 a.m. timeslot backfired; The Doctors saw no ratings bump from the serial whose presence had indirectly caused its ratings decline. NBC's serial lineup at the time was struggling in the ratings as a whole and The Doctors was no exception as it continued to falter, becoming one of the few serials at the time to fall below 2.0 in the ratings. Preemptions for other programming, along with the performance of Family Feud on ABC and having to compete with The Young and the Restless in some markets, drove the numbers to record-setting lows.

NBC announced the cancellation of The Doctors (along with that of Texas) during the fall of 1982, and the last episode aired on December 31, 1982. The show once again finished in last place as part of the still-struggling NBC daytime lineup, which failed to see one of its serials finish in the top five in the final Nielsens for a fifth consecutive season. The ratings for The Doctors bottomed out at 1.6, less than half of what they were the year before and nearly one-fourth of what they were three years earlier. The final number broke a record set by the short-lived ABC soap The Best of Everything, which pulled a 1.8 rating at the conclusion of its only season in 1970; only Sunset Beach (1997–1999) and Passions (1999–2007), two later NBC serials, finished a season with a lower final rating.

The ninety minutes freed up by the cancellations of The Doctors and Texas were filled by game shows beginning the following Monday. The Doctors saw its place taken by Just Men!, which was cancelled after thirteen weeks. The noon timeslot would not receive a stable show until Super Password premiered in September 1984, which ran until March 1989.

Ratings History 
For historical ratings information, see List of American daytime soap opera ratings

1960s 
1962–1963 Season
 1. As the World Turns 13.7
 11. The Doctors         3.4 (Debut: April 1, 1963)

1963–1964 Season
 1. As the World Turns 15.4
 8. The Doctors            3.4

1964–1965 Season
 1. As the World Turns 14.5
 8. The Doctors            7.5

1965–1966 Season
 1. As the World Turns 13.9
 9. The Doctors            6.6

1966–1967 Season
 1. As the World Turns 12.7
 8. The Doctors            7.6

1967–1968 Season
 1. As the World Turns 13.6
 5. The Doctors            9.7

1968–1969 Season
 1. As the World Turns 13.8
 5. The Doctors            9.3

1969–1970 Season
 1. As the World Turns 13.6
 8. The Doctors            8.6

1970s 
1970–1971 Season
 1. As the World Turns 12.4
 7. The Doctors            9.4

1971–1972 Season
 1. As the World Turns 11.1
 5. The Doctors            9.3

1972–1973 Season
 1. As the World Turns 10.6
 5. The Doctors            9.3

1973–1974 Season
 1. As the World Turns 9.7
 1. Days of our Lives    9.7
 1. Another World         9.7
 4. The Doctors 9.5

1974–1975 Season
 1. As the World Turns 10.8
 6. The Doctors            9.0

1975–1976 Season
 1. As the World Turns 9.4
 8. The Doctors          7.3

1976–1977 Season
 1. As the World Turns 9.9
 11. The Doctors         6.9

1977–1978 Season
 1. As the World Turns 8.6
 1. Another World 8.6
 11. The Doctors         6.5

1978–1979 Season
 1. All My Children 9.0
 11. The Doctors 6.3

1979–1980 Season
 1. General Hospital 10.5
 11. The Doctors      6.1

1980s 
1980–1981 Season
 1. General Hospital 14.0
 13. The Doctors      3.8

1981–1982 Season
 1. General Hospital 13.8
 15. The Doctors      3.3

1982–1983 Season
 1. General Hospital 11.4
 14. The Doctors      1.6 (Final Season; ended December 31, 1982)

Reruns
In July 2014, Retro TV announced that it would begin broadcasting reruns of The Doctors in the latter half of the year, starting with episodes from 1967.

On September 29, 2014, the network began airing two episodes of The Doctors each weekday, starting at 12 p.m. (ET)/11 a.m. (CT) (which was also the series' last time slot on NBC). Retro TV followed this up by adding two more daily airings of The Doctors reruns at 9 p.m. (ET)/8 p.m. (CT), beginning December 22, 2014.

Retro TV started off their reruns of The Doctors in September 2014 with the episode which originally aired December 4, 1967, and due to the 1980-82 episodes being unavailable due to the pandemic, stopped its run of episodes with the December 31, 1979 episode on April 23, 2020, at which point syndication on Retro TV restarted with the December 4, 1967 episode on April 27, 2020. 

As of March 2023, Retro TV still hasn't announced when or if they will air the 1980-82 episodes, angering many loyal viewers.

, episodes airing date from November 1970, with one episode aired at 12 p.m. Eastern Time and a rerun of the noontime episode airing at 6:30 p.m. The Doctors has been distributed by SFM Entertainment, which has 4,865 episodes available for syndication, only 290 episodes short of the entire run.

As of July 2018 Retro was running the series seven days a week, but from three different periods of time, with Monday through Friday with one time frame, and then Saturday and Sunday each with two additional respective time frames in the series.

Proposed spin-off
House of Hope was a proposed spin-off of The Doctors in 1970. NBC Daytime picked up Somerset, the Another World spin-off, instead.

A real-life police investigation involving The Doctors was used as the basis for the 29th episode of Cagney and Lacey, entitled "Matinee", where a fictional TV soap opera helped solve a murder case.

Cast
Core characters during the series' run included:
 James Pritchett as Dr. Matt Powers (1963–1982)
 Ann Williams (1963–1965), Bethel Leslie (1965–1968), Kathleen Murray (March 1968), and Lydia Bruce (1968–1982) as Dr. Maggie Hansen Powers
 Gerald Gordon as neurosurgeon Dr. Nick Bellini (1966–1975, 1976)
 David O'Brien as Dr. Steve Aldrich (1967–1982)
 Carolee Campbell (1967–1976), and Jada Rowland (1976–1982) as Carolee Simpson Aldrich, R. N. 
 Elizabeth Hubbard (1964–1969; 1970–1977; 1981–1982) and Virginia Vestoff (1969–1970) as Dr. Althea Davis
 Glenn Corbett as Jason Aldrich (1976–1978; 1979 ; 1980–1981)

Several well-known actors and actresses had roles on The Doctors throughout its long run, including:
 Marc Alaimo as Frank Barton (1971-1972)
 Jane Badler as Natalie Bell Dancy (1981–1982)
 Alec Baldwin as Billy Aldrich (1980–1982)
 Nancy Barrett as Nurse Kathy Ryker #2 (1971–1972)
 Kathy Bates as Phyllis (dayplayer, 1978)
 Doris Belack as Dr. Claudia Howard (1980)
 Peter Burnell (1968–1973), Armand Assante (1975-1976), as Dr. Mike Powers, 
 Ellen Burstyn as Dr. Kate Bartok (1964–65).  
 Chris Calloway as Ivie Gooding (1982)
 Shawn Campbell as Billy Aldrich (1977–79)
 David Canary as Warner Far Wind (1979, 1980)
 Paul Carr as Dr. Paul Summers (1976-1977)
 Dixie Carter as Dr. Linda Elliott (1977)
 Peggy Cass as H. Sweeney (1978-1979)
 Zaida Coles as Anna Ford (1968–1970)
 Geraldine Court as Ann Larimer (1973–1975, 1976–1977)
 Augusta Dabney as Theodora Van Allen (1980–1981)
 Ted Danson as Dr. Mitchell Pearson (1977)
 Nancy Donohue as Nancy Bennet (1968–1969)
 Olympia Dukakis as Mrs. Martin (1978)
 Mark Goddard as Lt. Paul Reed (1982)
 Dorothy Fielding as Sara Dancy Powers (1977–1979)
 Julia Duffy as Penny Davis (1973–1974, 1975–1977)
 Jonathan Frakes as Tom Carroll (1977–1978)
 Jock Gaynor as Dr. William Scott (1963–1964)
 Gil Gerard as Dr. Alan Stewart (1973–1976)
 Katherine Glass as Mary Jane "M. J." Match (1978–1981)
 Gracie Harrison as Greta Van Powers #5 (1980-1981)
 Kathryn Harrold as Nola Dancy Aldrich (1976–1977)
 John Heffernan as Professor Everett Chambers (1976)
 Earl Hindman as Roy Griffin (1974)
 Patrick Horgan as Dr. John Morrison (1970–1974)
 Anna Maria Horsford as Group Therapy Patient (1977)
 Alvin Ing as Dr. Chiang (1974) 
 House Jameson as Nathan Bunker (1967–1968)
 Adam Kennedy as Brock Hayden (1965)
 Dianne Kirksey as Bobbi Duvall (1980–81)
 Terry Kiser as Dr. John Rice (1967–1968)
 Barbara Lang as Marilyn Langley (1982)
 Louise Lasser as Jackie
 Laryssa Lauret as Dr. Karen Werner (1967–1969, 1971–1972, 1975)
 Elizabeth Lawrence as Virginia Dancy (1976–78)
 Jean LeClerc as Dr. Jean-Marc Gautier (1982)
 Karl Light as Dave Davis (c. 1963–1966)
 Pamela Lincoln as Doreen Aldrich #2 (1977–1979)
 Franc Luz as Dr. John Bennett (1979-1981)
 Valerie Mahaffey as Ashley Bennett (1979-1981)
 Meg Mundy as Mona Aldrich Croft (1972–1973, 1975–1982)
 Denise Nickerson as Katie Harris
 James Noble as Dr. Bill Winters (1967–1968)
 Terry O'Quinn as Dr. Jerry Dancy (1981)
 Ray "Cliff Owens as Dr. Richard Styner (1968)
 Petronia Paley as Dr. Jessie Rawlings (1977–78)
 John Pankow as Danny Martin (1981–1982)
 Holly Peters as Nurse Kathy Ryker #3 (1972–1973)
 Carol Pfander as Nurse Kathy Ryker #1 (1970–1971)
 Nancy Pinkerton as Viveca Strand (1979-1981)
 Carol Potter as Betsy Match (1977)
 Ralph Purdum as Phillip Townsend III (1968–1969) 
 Victoria Racimo as Tia Mahala
 Larry Riley as Calvin Barnes (1980-1982)
 Rex Robbins as Murray Glover (1981–82)
 Conrad Roberts as Ed Stark (1968–1969)
 Mercedes Ruehl as Nurse Ursula (1977) 
 Richard Sanders as the Bartender (1974)
 P. Jay Sidney as Paul Stark (1968–1969)
 Hillary B. Smith as Kit McCormack, R. N. (1982)
 Jocelyn Somers as Jessica Bartok
 Tom Spratley as Fred Sanders (1974)
 Nancy Stafford as Adrienne/Felicia Hunt (dual role) (1982)
 Count Stovall as Dr. Hank Chambers (1978–79,1981)
 Anna Stuart as Toni Ferra Powers (1971–1976)
 Robert Frank Telfer as Luke Dancy (1976–1982)
 Marie Thomas as Lauri James Iverson (1972,1973–1975)
 Pamela Toll as Liz Wilson (1966–1970) 
 Kathleen Turner as Nola Dancy Aldrich (1978–1979)
 Nana Visitor as Darcy Collins (1980–81)
 Nicholas Walker as Brad Huntington (1980–81)
 Peter Walker as Edmund Powell (1980)
 Sigourney Weaver (pre 1976)
 Beatrice Winde as Lillian Foster (1980–81)
 Jennifer Wood as Doreen Aldrich #1 (1977)
 Ian Ziering as Erich Aldrich  (1981–1982)
 Kim Zimmer as Nola Dancy Aldrich (1979–1982)

Among the guest stars on The Doctors were Johnny Carson as himself, Don Imus as himself, Judy Collins as Judith Howard, Tony Randall as himself, and Brooke Shields as Elizabeth Harrington.

Main crew
Some notable writers, producers and directors of The Doctors: Henry Kaplan, Dennis Brite, Douglas Marland, Frank Salisbury, Malcolm Marmorstein, Rita Lakin, Elizabeth Levin, Gerald Straub, Orvin Tovrov, Allen Potter, Joseph Stuart, Robert Costello, Leonard Kantor, Eileen and Robert Mason Pollock, David Cherrill, Peter Brash, Doris Quinlan, A.M. Barlow, Heather Matthews, Kate Brooks, Ralph Ellis, James Lipton, Eugenie Hunt, William T. Anderson (Lighting).

Head writers
Orin Tovrov, 1963 – 1966
Ian Martin, 1966 – 1967
John Kubek, 1967
Rita Lakin, June 1967 – June 1968
Rita Lakin and Rick Edelstein, June 1968 – June 1969
Rick Edelstein, June 1969 - November 1969
Ira Avery, November 1969 – April 1970
Ira Avery and Stanley H. Silverman, April 1970 – September 1970
Eileen and Robert Mason Pollock, September 1970 – August 1975
Robert Cenedella, August 1975 - February 1976
Margaret DePriest, February 1976 - September 1976
Douglas Marland, September 1976 – 1977
Mel Brez and Ethel Brez, Late 1977 - April 1978
Linda Grover and David Cherrill, 1978 – February 26, 1979
Elizabeth Levin and David Cherrill, February 27, 1979 - December 1979
Ralph Ellis and Eugenie Hunt, December 1979 – 1980
Lawrence Konner and Ronnie Wencker-Konner, 1980 – 1981
Elizabeth Levin, September–December 1981
Harding Lemay and Stephen Lemay, December 1981 –  May 1982
Barbara Morgenroth and Leonard Kantor, June – December 1982

Executive Producers
Orin Tovrov, 1963–1965
Jerry Layton, 1965–1967
Allen M. Potter, 1967–1973
Joseph Stuart, 1973–1975
Jeff Young, 1975–1977
Chuck Weiss, 1977–1979
Doris Quinlan, 1979–1980
James A. Baffico, 1980–1981
Robert Costello, 1981–1982
Gerald Straub, 1982

Awards and nominations

Daytime Emmy Award wins

Drama series and performer categories

Primetime Emmy Award wins
 1971 "23rd Primetime Emmy Awards" (Drama Series)
 1972 "24th Primetime Emmy Awards" (Drama Series)

See also

Jonathan Frakes

References

External links 
 

1960s American drama television series
1970s American drama television series
1980s American drama television series
1960s American medical television series
1970s American medical television series
1980s American medical television series
1963 American television series debuts
1982 American television series endings
American television soap operas
Black-and-white American television shows
Colgate-Palmolive
Daytime Emmy Award for Outstanding Drama Series winners
NBC original programming
Television shows set in New England